Rubén Díaz may refer to:

Rubén Díaz Sr. (born 1943), New York City Council member
Rubén Díaz Jr. (born 1973), Borough President of the Bronx (New York City)
Rubén Oswaldo Díaz (1946–2018), Argentine footballer
Rubén Ruiz Díaz (born 1969), Paraguayan footballer
Rubén Toribio Díaz (born 1952), Peruvian footballer

See also
Rubén Díez (born 1993), Spanish footballer
Rúben Dias (born 1997), Portuguese footballer